The Sweden women's youth national handball team is the national under–17 Handball team of Sweden. Controlled by the Swedish Handball Federation it represents the country in international matches.

History

Youth Olympic Games 

 Champions   Runners up   Third place   Fourth place

IHF World Championship 

 Champions   Runners up   Third place   Fourth place

European Championship 
 Champions   Runners up   Third place   Fourth place

References

External links 
Official website 

Handball in Sweden
Women's handball in Sweden
Women's national youth handball teams
Handball